Andrew Ian Holden (born 14 September 1962 in Flint, Wales) is a Welsh former football player and coach, who was most recently with Rotherham United. He had playing careers at Chester City, Wigan and Oldham Athletic and was a long-serving coach at Everton between 1994 and 2013, and also coached at Hibernian. He was a strong and powerful defender and was capped by Wales once at both full and under-21 level in 1984.

Career
Holden's full appearance for Wales as a substitute against Israel at the end of the 1983–84 season was remarkable as a year earlier he had been playing non-league football for Rhyl and his new Chester City team had comfortably finished bottom of Division Four. However, Holden had stood out in a poor side and he would retain his player of the season accolade the following campaign. He had made his Football League debut on 27 August 1983 for Chester in a 1–1 draw with Northampton Town.

Unfortunately, club captain Holden became dogged by injuries and he rarely featured in Chester's 1985–86 promotion campaign. He joined Wigan for £50,000 in October 1986 at a time when Chester were suffering a financial crisis and facing a winding up order. He left Chester after making exactly 100 Football League appearances for them in three and a half years, when he bagged 16 goals – an impressive strike rate for a central defender thanks to his penalty taking and ability to head in set-pieces.

Holden continued to impress at Wigan and this led to a transfer to Oldham Athletic in January 1989. Despite spending several years at Boundary Park, Holden played just 22 league games due to his ongoing injury problems and had to watch on from the sidelines as his teammates played in the top-flight from 1991 to 1994 and reached the League Cup final in 1990. However, he did play in both enthralling FA Cup semi-finals for Oldham against Manchester United, as the Latics took their illustrious opponents to extra-time in the replay before losing 2–1. His final game was a substitute appearance for Oldham was in a 2–1 defeat by Middlesbrough in November 1994, shortly before he followed manager Joe Royle to Everton as part of the coaching staff.

He has survived several managerial changes to become a trusted part of the backroom team at Goodison Park, with his matchday role having become more prominent since the departure of assistant manager Alan Irvine to Preston North End. He departed Everton in July 2013. He was appointed assistant coach at Hibernian in July 2014.

On 30 June 2016 Holden was appointed first team coach at Rotherham United, rejoining Alan Stubbs, under whom he worked at Hibernian. Holden left Rotherham after the club sacked Alan Stubbs following a poor run of results.

Holden was appointed as the manager of Welsh Alliance team Flint Town United F.C. in June 2017.

Honours
Chester City
 Division Four runners-up: 1985–86 (10 appearances)
 Player of the Season: 1983–84, 1984–85. Inducted in to the Chester FC hall of fame 1/1/2020
Oldham Athletic
 FA Cup semi-finalist: 1989–90, Oldham Athletic

References

External links

Chester City F.C. players
Wigan Athletic F.C. players
Oldham Athletic A.F.C. players
Rhyl F.C. players
1962 births
Living people
Welsh footballers
Wales under-21 international footballers
People from Flint, Flintshire
Sportspeople from Flintshire
Association football defenders
English Football League players
Wales international footballers
Oldham Athletic A.F.C. non-playing staff
Everton F.C. non-playing staff
Hibernian F.C. non-playing staff